Dockery Plantation was a  cotton plantation and sawmill in Dockery, Mississippi, on the Sunflower River between Ruleville and Cleveland, Mississippi. It is widely regarded as the place where Delta blues music was born. Blues musicians resident at Dockery included Charley Patton, Robert Johnson and Howlin' Wolf. The property was added to the National Register of Historic Places in 2006.

History
The plantation was started in 1895 by Will Dockery (1865–1936), a graduate of the University of Mississippi who originally bought the land for its timber but soon recognized  the richness of its soil.  At the time, much of the Delta area was still a wilderness of cypress and gum trees, roamed by panthers and wolves and plagued with mosquitoes. The land was gradually cleared and drained for cotton cultivation, which encouraged an influx of black labourers. Some became settled sharecroppers, who would work a portion of the land in return for a share of the crop, while others were itinerant workers. Dockery earned a good reputation for treating his workers and sharecroppers fairly and thus attracted workers from throughout the South.

Dockery's land was relatively remote, but was opened up for development by a new branch of the Yazoo and Mississippi Valley Railroad, known as the Yellow Dog. Around 1900, Dockery had a rail terminal built on his plantation, so connecting his land with the main rail system at Rosedale. Because of its circuitous route, this local line was known as the "Pea Vine".

Dockery Plantation eventually supported over 2,000 workers, who were paid in the plantation's own coins. In addition to the railroad terminal, it had its own general store, post office, school, doctor, and churches. The workers’ quarters included boardinghouses, where they lived, socialized and played music, particularly guitars, which had been introduced to the area by Mexican workers in the 1890s. Dockery took no interest in his workers' music, but he made it easy for them to travel and to spend their leisure time as they pleased.

Charley Patton and his family are believed to have moved around 1900 to the Dockery Plantation, where he came under the influence of an older musician, Henry Sloan. In turn, Patton became the central figure of a group of blues musicians including Willie Brown, Tommy Johnson, and Eddie "Son" House, who played around the local area. Because of its location, central to Sunflower County’s black population of some 35,000 in 1920, the plantation became known as a centre for informal musical entertainment. By the mid-1920s, the group widened to include a younger generation of musicians, including Robert Johnson, Chester "Howlin’ Wolf" Burnett, Roebuck "Pops" Staples, and David "Honeyboy" Edwards.  Some of these were itinerant workers, while others lived more permanently on the farms.

In 1936, the plantation was inherited by Joe Rice Dockery (1906–1982). With agricultural mechanisation and the employment attractions of the larger cities further north, the plantation settlements gradually disappeared, although some of the historic buildings remain. The farm later diversified to produce corn, rice and soybeans. Later members of the Dockery family have established a foundation to fund research into the Delta blues.

The property was added to the National Register of Historic Places in 2006. Today the site hosts a small number of private tours, lectures, and events in partnership with the Thelonious Monk Institute of Jazz, Delta State University, and other academic and cultural institutions.

Historical marker

A marker designating Dockery Plantation as a site  on the Mississippi Blues Trail is an acknowledgment of the important contribution of the plantation to the development of the blues in Mississippi.

The marker was placed in Cleveland, Mississippi. Governor Haley Barbour stated

References

Houses completed in 1930
Mississippi Blues Trail
Yazoo and Mississippi Valley Railroad
Railway stations on the National Register of Historic Places in Mississippi
Houses on the National Register of Historic Places in Mississippi
1895 establishments in Mississippi
Houses in Bolivar County, Mississippi
Houses in Sunflower County, Mississippi
Historic districts on the National Register of Historic Places in Mississippi
Agricultural buildings and structures on the National Register of Historic Places in Mississippi
National Register of Historic Places in Bolivar County, Mississippi
National Register of Historic Places in Sunflower County, Mississippi
Cotton plantations in Mississippi